Amy Gibson (born November 25, 1960) is an American daytime television Emmy-nominated actress and businesswoman.

Career 
Gibson's credits include Love of Life (Lynn Henderson), Young and the Restless (Alana Anthony Jackson), and General Hospital (Colette Francoise) in the 1980s.

Personal life 
Gibson is the younger sister of Jody Gibson and the niece of singer Georgia Gibbs, a recording artist with a star on the Hollywood Walk of Fame. Her mother Tobe Gibson is the talent agent who discovered Tom Cruise.

Secretly bald for over 20 years due to the medical condition alopecia areata, Gibson built a post-acting career in wig manufacturing and consulting services to those in need of guidance and support who are dealing with hair loss.

Filmography

Film

Television

References

Living people
1960 births
21st-century American businesspeople
American soap opera actresses
People from Westchester County, New York
21st-century American businesswomen